The ninth season of CSI: Crime Scene Investigation premiered on CBS on October 9, 2008, and ended May 14, 2009. The series stars William Petersen, Marg Helgenberger and Laurence Fishburne.

Plot
As the team grieve for their fallen colleague ("For Warrick"), Grissom makes a life changing decision ("One to Go"), during the ninth season of CSI. Also this season, Sara investigates the death of a woman attacked nine years ago ("The Happy Place"), new CSI Riley Adams joins the team ("Art Imitates Life"), and she and Nick witness a store robbery on Halloween ("Let it Bleed"), Grissom attends the trial of the Miniature Killer ("Woulda, Shoulda, Coulda"), and an infamous serial murderer brings Dr. Raymond Langston face-to-face with the CSI team ("19 Down"). As Catherine adjusts to life as the team's leader, she investigates the bizarre, the brutal, and the unlikely, including an S&M related murder ("Leave out all the Rest"), an arson-homicide ("The Grave Shift"), the murder of an FBI agent ("Disarmed & Dangerous"), death-by-toothpaste ("Deep Fried & Minty Fresh"), and a Mexican wrestling related death ("Mascara"). Nick, meanwhile, investigates the happenings of a seedy motel over the course of a year ("Turn, Turn, Turn"), and Hodges and Wendy attend a sci-fi convention ("A Space Oddity").

Controversy
A writer and producer of episode 13 ("Deep Fried and Minty Fresh"), Sarah Goldfinger, was sued for defamation of character by California real estate agents Melinda and Scott Tamkin.

Cast

Changes
William Petersen and Gary Dourdan both depart the main cast, and are replaced by Lauren Lee Smith and Laurence Fishburne. Jorja Fox recurs.

Main cast

 William Petersen as Gil Grissom, a CSI Level 3 Supervisor (episodes 1–10)
 Marg Helgenberger as Catherine Willows, a CSI Level 3 Supervisor
 Gary Dourdan as Warrick Brown, a CSI Level 3 (episode 1)
 George Eads as Nick Stokes, a CSI Level 3
 Eric Szmanda as Greg Sanders, a CSI Level 3
 Robert David Hall as Al Robbins, the Chief Medical Examiner
 Wallace Langham as David Hodges, a Trace Technician
 Paul Guilfoyle as Jim Brass, a Homicide Detective Captain
 Lauren Lee Smith as Riley Adams, a CSI Level 2 (episodes 3–24)
 Laurence Fishburne as Raymond Langston, a CSI Level 1 (episodes 11–24, guest episodes 9–10)

Recurring cast

Guest cast

Episodes

References

09
2009 American television seasons
2008 American television seasons